Ile Aux Galets, also known as Skillagallee or Skillagalee Island, is located in northeast Lake Michigan, between Beaver Island and the mainland, approximately  northwest of Cross Village in Emmet County, Michigan.

History
The islet is home to a significant colony of ring-billed gulls.  Its name, given by early French explorers, means "Isle of Pebbles."  It is said that the English speakers found the French name unpronounceable, and "Ile aux Galets"—soon misheard, misunderstood and mispronounced—transmuted into "Skillagalee" (or some variant) which took hold.  By the "mid 1800s references to the original French name all but disappeared."

There are many wrecks near Skillagalee island. Loaded with general goods, the Patchin's course into Grays Reef Passage was disrupted by currents that pulled her onto Skillagalee's shore. Her crew escaped and was rescued, but foul winds and weather thwarted many attempts to set her free. She was "pounded to pieces, becoming yet another of Lake Michigan's many victims."

References

Uninhabited islands of Michigan
Islands of Lake Michigan in Michigan
Landforms of Emmet County, Michigan